Dekedaha FC is a Somali football club based in Mogadishu, Somalia. Up to 2013 they played under the nickname of Ports FC.

Achievements
Somalia League: 5
 1998, 2007, 2017, 2018, 2019.

Somalia Cup: 2
 2002, 2004.

Somalia Super Cup: 2
 2018, 2019.

Performance in CAF competitions
CAF Champions League: 1 appearance
2020 – Preliminary Round

CAF Confederation Cup: 0 appearance

References

External links
 Team's profile – leballonrond.fr

Dekedaha FC
Football clubs in Somalia
Sport in Mogadishu